Keith Wallace may refer to:

 Keith Wallace (wine writer)
 Keith Wallace (boxer)